Methylketol or 2-methylindole is a mildly toxic and slightly flammable organic compound which occurs as a white solid which turns brown over time.  It has chemical formula
.

Methylketol is used as an intermediate for synthesizing dyes, pigments, optical brighteners, and pharmaceuticals.

See also
 Indole
 Methyl
 1-Methylindole
 5-Methylindole
 7-Methylindole
 Skatole (3-methylindole)

References

Methylindoles
Foul-smelling chemicals